The United States Department of Justice Tax Division is responsible for the prosecution of both civil and criminal cases arising under the Internal Revenue Code and other tax laws of the United States.  The Division began operation in 1934, under United States Attorney General Homer Stille Cummings, who charged it with primary responsibility for supervising all federal litigation involving internal revenue (following an executive order from President Franklin Delano Roosevelt).

Responsibilities
The Tax Division works closely with public schools and corporations of the state and the Criminal Investigation Division and other units of the Internal Revenue Service to develop and coordinate federal tax policy. Among the Division's duties are:

Participating in the President's Corporate Fraud Task Force
Working with the Securities and Exchange Commission to promote corporate integrity
Pursuing criminal tax investigations and prosecutions of corporate executives
Handling criminal investigations and prosecutions of terrorist financing cases
Fighting abusive and fraudulent tax promotions
Seeking civil injunctions against promoters of abusive tax schemes
Handling criminal prosecutions of major tax fraud promoters
Working with the Federal Trade Commission to combat internet fraud schemes
Using both civil and criminal tools to put tax fraud promoters out of business
Enforcing IRS summonses for records of corporate tax shelters
Attacking the use of foreign bank accounts to evade taxes
Enforcing IRS summonses for records of offshore credit card transactions
Initiating criminal investigations of suspects in offshore tax evasion cases
Combating schemes that cheat the IRS through abuse of the bankruptcy system
Enhancing policy coordination between the Tax Division and the IRS

Current programs
In August 2013, the Justice Department announced their Swiss bank program, which "provides Swiss banks an opportunity to come forward, cooperate, disclose their illegal conduct, and be eligible for non-prosecution agreements -- or in egregious cases, deferred prosecution agreements."

The offshore voluntary disclosure program is for individual taxpayer to come forward and pay owed taxes on undisclosed income. However, National Taxpayer Advocate Nina E. Olson advocated changes to this program to encourage account holders of accounts with small balances to come forward.

Leadership
The current Acting Assistant Attorney General is David A. Hubbert, the division's incumbent Deputy Assistant Attorney General (DAAG) for Civil Trial Matters. 

On February 4, 2020, President Donald Trump nominated Richard E. Zuckerman as Assistant Attorney General to head the Tax Division, a post that requires Senate confirmation. Zuckerman left the post on January 20, 2021. He was previously appointed Principal Deputy Assistant Attorney General and Deputy Assistant Attorney General for Criminal Matters of the Tax Division on December 18, 2017. He succeeded Caroline D. Ciraolo, former Acting Assistant Attorney General, who left the Tax Division in January 2017.

Organization
The head of the Tax Division is an Assistant Attorney General, who is appointed by the President of the United States. The Assistant Attorney General is assisted by four Deputy Assistant Attorneys General, who are each career attorneys, who each oversee a different branch of the Tax Division's sections.

Assistant Attorney General for Tax Division
Deputy Assistant Attorney General for Policy and Planning
Office of Legislation, Policy and Management
Office of Training and Career Development
Office of Management and Administration
Deputy Assistant Attorney General for Criminal Matters 
Northern Criminal Enforcement Section
Southern Criminal Enforcement Section
Western Criminal Enforcement Section
Criminal Appeals and Tax Enforcement Policy Section
Deputy Assistant Attorney General for Review and Appellate 
Civil Appellate Section
Office of Review
Deputy Assistant Attorney General for Civil Matters
Central Civil Trial Section
Eastern Civil Trial Section
Northern Civil Trial Section
Southern Civil Trial Section
Southwestern Civil Trial Section
Western Civil Trial Section
Court of Federal Claims Section

References

External links
 
 USDOJ Tax Division Alumni Blog

Tax Division
Taxation in the United States